Potassium pentasulfide is the inorganic compound with the formula . It is a red-orange solid that dissolves in water. The salt decomposes rapidly in air.
It is one of several polysulfide salts with the general formula , where M = Li, Na, K and n = 2, 3, 4, 5, 6. The polysulfide salts of potassium and sodium are similar.

Preparation and reactions
The salt is prepared by the addition of elemental sulfur to potassium sulfide. An idealized equation is shown for potassium hydrosulfide:
4 KSH + S8 → 2 K2S5 + 2 H2S

The structure consists of zigzag chains of  paired with  ions.

Occurrence
Various polysulfides  -  are components of liver of sulfur. Polysulfides, like sulfides, can induce stress corrosion cracking in carbon steel and stainless steel.

References

Potassium compounds
Polysulfides
Inorganic compounds
Chalcogenides